Resetarits is a surname. Notable people with the surname include:

Karin Resetarits, meanwhile Karin Kraml (born 1961), Austrian journalist and Member of the European Parliament
Lukas Resetarits (born 1947), Austrian cabaret artist and actor
Thomas Resetarits (1939–2022), Austrian sculptor
Willi Resetarits (1948–2022), Austrian singer, comedian, and human rights activist